Inner Manipur Lok Sabha constituency is one of the two Lok Sabha (parliamentary) constituencies in Manipur, a state in northeastern India.

Assembly segments
Inner Manipur Lok Sabha constituency is composed of the following Vidhan Sabha (legislative assembly) segments:

Members of Parliament

Election results

General Election 2019

General Election 2014

General Election 2009

General Election 2004

References

See also
 List of Constituencies of the Lok Sabha

Lok Sabha constituencies in Manipur
Bishnupur district